Balgok station is the first stop of the U Line, in the city of Uijeongbu. It opened to the public on June 29, 2012, with revenue starting on July 1.

Station layout

Gallery

References

Seoul Metropolitan Subway stations
Railway stations opened in 2012
Metro stations in Uijeongbu
U Line